Enamorándonos (English: "Falling in Love"; also known in the United States as Enamorándonos USA) is an American dating show that is shown on Spanish-language channel Univision's affiliate, UniMás. The show is hosted by Chilean show host Rafael Araneda and Mexican show host Ana Patricia Gámez. It was formerly hosted by Mexican Karina Banda. Banda announced she was leaving the show on April 1, 2022. The show is broadcast in the United States and in Puerto Rico.

During 2022, Televisa and Univision announced the creation of an off-shoot series, named Enamorandonos: La Isla, which will be hosted by Banda and her husband, Puerto Rican actor, singer and show host Carlos Ponce. The offshoot will be available in the United States and Latin America, but it will be filmed in Turkey.

References 

American reality television series
2019 American television series debuts